Scott Laycock (born 15 September 1971) is an Australian professional golfer. 

Laycock won the Victorian Open in 2001 in Australia. He shot an aggregate of 270, 18 under par. This was a tournament record, but has since been broken by Min Woo Lee at the 2020 ISPS Handa Vic Open, when he shot an aggregate of 269, 19 under par. 

Laycock joined the Japan Golf Tour in 2000, and won Bridgestone Open in 2002. In 2003 he played on the PGA Tour but failed to maintain his playing rights. He has featured in the top 100 of the Official World Golf Rankings.

Laycock played in the PGA Championship once and The Open Championship twice between 2002–2007; missing the cut in all three of his major championship appearances.

Professional wins (4)

Japan Golf Tour wins (1)

Japan Golf Tour playoff record (0–1)

PGA Tour of Australasia wins (2)

Other wins (1)
1997 Hugo Boss Foursomes

Playoff record
Asian Tour playoff record (0–1)

OneAsia Tour playoff record (0–1)

Results in major championships

CUT = missed the halfway cut
Note: Laycock only played in The Open Championship and the PGA Championship.

Results in World Golf Championships

See also
2002 PGA Tour Qualifying School graduates

References

External links

Australian male golfers
Japan Golf Tour golfers
PGA Tour golfers
PGA Tour of Australasia golfers
Golfers from Melbourne
1971 births
Living people